is a Japanese actor and model. His first major acting role was as Mamoru Chiba (Tuxedo Kamen/Prince Endymion) in the live action Pretty Guardian Sailor Moon. After finishing PGSM, Shibue has appeared in Kamen Rider Hibiki as Ibuki (Kamen Rider Ibuki), later reprising his role for the world of Hibiki in Kamen Rider Decade. He had a role in Rina Aiuchi's music video "Full Jump" and also does commercials for "NTT Docomo Chūgoku" and "AU." Shibue has modeled for "Hotdog Press" and "Junon".

Filmography

Series
 2003-2004: Pretty Guardian Sailor Moon – Mamoru Chiba/Tuxedo Kamen/Prince Endymion
 2005-2006: Kamen Rider Hibiki – Ibuki / Kamen Rider Ibuki (voice) 
 2006: Yoruō 〜 YAOH 〜 – host club role of "gorgeous" (episode 11)
 2006: Tōbō-sha Orin – Shinpachi (episode 6)
 2007: Ai no gekijō: Sand Chronicles – Tsukishima Fuji (adult age) 
 2007: Ai no gekijō: Ainōta! – Kimura Akira
 2007: Sexy Voice and Robo Hayashi Kazumi no atarashī kare (episode 2)
 2007: Hotaru no Hikari – Tadokoro Junpei
 2008: Binbō Danshi Bonbi Men – Sunakawa Takayuki
 2008: Hisho no Kagami – Hoshino Satoru
 2008: Monday Golden: Tsuwano Satsujin Jiken – Toki Tomoyoshi
 2008: Monday Golden: Yamamura Misa Suspense: Sen no Rikyu Nazo no Satsujin Jiken – Sakai Toshiki
 2008: Aishu No Romera – Kogure Satoru
 2009: O cha-beri – Kōsaka Junichi (episode 17)
 2009: Kamen Rider Decade – Ibuki / Kamen Rider Ibuki (voice)
 2009: LOVE GAME – host/ Hatano Ryūji (episode 8)
 2009: Oretachi wa Tenshi da! NO ANGEL NO LUCK! – CAP/ Inui Kyōsuke
 2010: Doyō Jidaigeki: Katsura Chidzuru Shinsatsu Nichiroku – Shōza (episode 7)
 2010: Saturday Wide Theater: Jinrui gakusha: Misaki Kumiko no satsujin kantei shirīzu Sunahama o samayō hakkotsu shitai! – Naoki Moriya
 2010: Saturday Wide Theater: Nishimura Kyōtarō Travel Mystery 54 Izu noumi ni kieta on'na- Osamu Sakai
 2010: Yamamura Misa Suspense: Kyouto Genjimonogatari Satsujin Emaki – Yamada Takashi
 2011: Saturday Wide Theater: Jinrui gakusha: Misaki Kumiko no satsujin kantei shirīzu Shisha o yomigaera seru wain no nazo!? – Moriya Naoki
 2011: Shin Keishichō sōsaikka 9 kakari season3 Episode 2 – Ichiro Saito
 2011: Doku hime to watashi – Nakagawa Tetsuya
 2011: Ranma  – Kamaitachi
 2012: Saturday Wide Theater: Nishimura Kyōtarō Travel Mystery 58 Yamagata shinkansen Tsubasa 129-gō no on'na! – Kinoshita Naoya
 2012: Shirato Osamu no Jikenbo Fifth and sixth story – Mizusawa Tetsurō
 2012: Deka Kurokawa Suzuki – Inoue Shinichirō (episode 10)
 2012: Asadora: Umechan Sensei – Tsuda (first College of Physicians)
 2012: Tsugunai – Kawaji Tatsurō
 2013: Saturday Wide Theater: Yamagata shinkansen Tsubasa 129-gō no on'na! –  Adachi detective
 2013: Zyuden Sentai Kyoryuger – Nakazato Hiroshi (episode 15)
 2019: Kishiryu Sentai Ryusoulger – Master Blue
 2020: Only I Am 17 Years Old

Films
 2005: Kamen Rider Hibiki & The Seven Senki – Ibuki / Kamen Rider Ibuki (voice)
 2007: Callaway – Makoto
 2010: Kurosawa Eiga – Shibue Joji (principal role)
 2010: Gachiban MAX II – host role (cameo appearance)
 2010: Kimi e no Melody – Kiriya Tsuyoshi
 2011: Furusato ga Eri – Aida Kanji (starring)
 2011: Hana Bāchan!! 〜 Watashi no Yama no Kamisama 〜 – Tokoro Kazushi
 2022: Residents of Evil
 2022: Love of a Brute

References

External links
 Official profile 
 

1983 births
Living people
Actors from Nagano Prefecture
Japanese male film actors
Japanese male stage actors
Japanese male television actors
21st-century Japanese male actors